Pass the Gravy is a 1928 short comedy silent film directed by Fred Guiol and supervised by Leo McCarey. It stars Max Davidson, Gene Morgan, Spec O'Donnell, Martha Sleeper, and Bert Sprotte. The movie was produced by Hal Roach and distributed by Metro-Goldwyn-Mayer Distributing Corporation. In 1998, the film was deemed "culturally significant" by the Library of Congress and selected for preservation in the United States National Film Registry.

Plot
Schultz is proud of his prize-winning rooster, Brigham. Davidson, who lives next door, raises flowers and has a son named Ignatz. Schultz's son has just become engaged to Davidson's daughter. Although the two fathers don't get along, their children's engagement seems like a good time to bury the hatchet. A celebration dinner is planned and Ignatz is given two dollars to go purchase a chicken. But Ignatz, wanting to keep the money for himself, takes Brigham instead. When the families gather together to eat the chicken, Ignatz realizes that he left Brigham's 1st Prize tag on the now cooked leg. Gradually, they all realize the chicken is Brigham, everyone, except the two fathers, Schultz and Davidson. Ignatz runs away. The engaged couple pantomime the truth to Davidson who after a scuffle runs away too.

Cast
Max Davidson - The father
Gene Morgan - Schultz's son
Spec O'Donnell - Ignatz
Martha Sleeper - The daughter
Bert Sprotte - Schultz

References

External links
Pass the Gravy essay  by Steve Massa on the National Film Registry website 

Pass the Gravy at Silent Era
Pass the Gravy essay by Daniel Eagan in America's Film Legacy: The Authoritative Guide to the Landmark Movies in the National Film Registry, A&C Black, 2010 , pages 136-137 

1928 films
American black-and-white films
1928 comedy films
Films directed by Fred Guiol
Films directed by Leo McCarey
Hal Roach Studios short films
American silent short films
United States National Film Registry films
Silent American comedy films
1928 short films
American comedy short films
1920s American films